Steve Porter (born 22 November 1969)  is a Paralympic wheelchair rugby union player from  Australia. He was born in Denmark, South Australia. He won silver medals at the 2000 Sydney Games and 2008 Beijing Games in the mixed wheelchair rugby event.

References

Paralympic wheelchair rugby players of Australia
Wheelchair rugby players at the 2000 Summer Paralympics
Wheelchair rugby players at the 2008 Summer Paralympics
Paralympic silver medalists for Australia
Living people
Medalists at the 2000 Summer Paralympics
Medalists at the 2008 Summer Paralympics
1969 births
Paralympic medalists in wheelchair rugby